Henson Branch is a stream in Bollinger County in the U.S. state of Missouri.

Henson Branch has the name of William Henson, a local landowner.

See also
List of rivers of Missouri

References

Rivers of Bollinger County, Missouri
Rivers of Missouri